{{Infobox military conflict
|conflict   = V-1 and V-2 Intelligence
|partof     = World War II technology & warfare
|image      =
|caption    =
|date       =
|place      = European Theatre of World War II
External media: map of V-weapon sites
|result     = ~25% fewer V-1s struck the London Civil Defence Region due to Double Cross
|combatant1 = Key Figures:
UK: Reginald Victor Jones
USA: Allen Dulles
|combatant2 = 
V-1: Max Wachtel
V-2: Walter Dornberger
|commander1 =
|commander2 =
|strength1  = agents & informants
|strength2  =   
|casualties1= 
|casualties2=
}}

Military intelligence on the V-1 and V-2 weapons developed by the Germans for attacks on the United Kingdom during the Second World War was important to countering them. Intelligence came from a number of sources and the Anglo-American intelligence agencies used it to assess the threat of the German V-weapons.

The activities included use of the Double Cross System for counter-intelligence and the British (code named) "Big Ben" project to reconstruct and evaluate German missile technology for which Denmark, Poland, Luxembourg, Sweden, and the USSR provided assistance.
German counter-intelligence ruses were used to mislead the Allies about V-1 launch sites and the Peenemünde Army Research Center which were targeted for attacks by the Allies.

The Polish resistance Home Army (Armia Krajowa), which conducted military operations against occupying German forces, was also heavily involved in intelligence work. This included operations investigating the German Wunderwaffe:  the V-1 flying bomb and the V-2 rocket'''. British intelligence received their first Polish report regarding the development of these weapons at Peenemünde in 1943.

Early reports

By the summer of 1941 Home Army intelligence began receiving reports from its field units regarding some kind of secret tests being carried out by the Germans on the island of Usedom in the Baltic Sea. A special "Bureau" was formed within intelligence group "Lombard", charged with espionage inside the 3rd Reich and the Polish areas incorporated into it after 1939, to investigate the matter and to coordinate future actions. Specialized scientific expertise was provided to the group by the engineer Antoni Kocjan, "Korona", a renowned pre-war glider constructor. Furthermore, as part of their operations the "Bureau" managed to recruit an Austrian anti-Nazi, Roman Traeger (T-As2), who was serving as an NCO in the Wehrmacht and was stationed on Usedom. Trager provided the AK with more detailed information regarding the "flying torpedoes" and pinpointed Peenemünde on Usedom as the site of the tests. The information obtained led to the first report from the AK to the British which was purportedly written by Jerzy Chmielewski, "Rafal", who was in charge of processing economic reports the "Lombard" group obtained.

Operation Most III

After V-2 flight testing began near the village of Blizna, south of Mielec (the first launch from there was on November 5, 1943), the AK had a unique opportunity to gather more information and to intercept parts of test rockets (most of which did not explode).

The AK quickly located the new testing ground at Blizna thanks to reports from local farmers and AK field units, who managed to obtain on their own pieces of the fired rockets, by arriving on the scene before German patrols. In late 1943 in cooperation with British intelligence, a plan was formed to make an attempt to capture a whole unexploded V-2 rocket and transport it to Britain.

At the time, opinion within British intelligence was divided. One group tended to believe the AK accounts and reports, while another was highly sceptical and argued that it was impossible to launch a rocket of the size reported by the AK using any known fuel.
Then in early March 1944, British Intelligence Headquarters received a report of a Polish Underground worker (code name "Makary") who had crawled up to the Blizna railway line and saw on a flatcar heavily guarded by SS troops "an object which, though covered by a tarpaulin, bore every resemblance to a monstrous torpedo." The Polish intelligence also informed the British about usage of liquid oxygen in a radio report from June 12, 1944. Some experts within both British and Polish intelligence communities quickly realized that learning the nature of the fuel utilized by the rockets was crucial, and hence, the need to obtain a working example.

From April 1944, numerous test rockets were falling near Sarnaki village, in the vicinity of the Bug River, south of Siemiatycze. The number of parts collected by the Polish intelligence increased. They were then analyzed by the Polish scientists in Warsaw. According to some reports, around May 20, 1944, a relatively undamaged V-2 rocket fell on the swampy bank of the Bug near Sarnaki and local Poles managed to hide it before German arrival. Subsequently, the rocket was dismantled and smuggled across Poland.  Operation Most III (Bridge III) secretly transported parts of the rocket out of Poland for analysis by British intelligence.

Impact on the course of the war
While the early knowledge on a rocket by AK was quite a feat in pure intelligence terms, it did not necessarily translate into significant results on the ground. On the other hand, the AK did alert the British as to the dangers posed by both missile designs, which led them to allocate more resources to bombing production and launching sites and thus lessened the eventual devastation caused by them.  Also, the Operation Hydra bombing raid on Peenemünde, purportedly carried out on the basis of Home Army intelligence, did delay the V-2 by six to eight weeks.

Timeline
Key
PR — aerial photographic reconnaissance
- exchange of early stray V2 rocket.
 — events regarding Nazi Germany V-weapon planning
 — locations in Occupied France
 — Polish reports of the Armia Krajowa
 — Reports gathered by the Luxembourg Resistance
,  — events regarding Anglo-American intelligence

The day after Strategic Bombing Directive No. 4 ended the strategic air war in Europe, the use of radar was discontinued in the London Civil Defence Region for detecting V-2 launches.  The last launches had been on March 27 (V-2) and March 29 (V-1 flying bomb).

See also
Battle of the V-1

References
Notes

Bibliography

Further reading
Churchill 'Memoirs of the Second World War'
Eisenhower 'European Crusade'
V-2 Ballistic Missile 1942 - 52

V-weapons
Technical intelligence during World War II
Nazi-related lists
German military-related lists
World War II-related lists